Ron "Stix" Ballatore (1941 – April 27, 2012) was an American college and international swimming coach.  From 1978 to 1994, Ballatore was the head coach of the men's swimming and diving team at the University of California, Los Angeles (UCLA), where he coached his UCLA Bruins swimmers to an NCAA national championship in 1982.

In sixteen years at UCLA, Ballatore's Bruins never won a Pacific-10 Conference team championship, but finished second in the conference ten out of sixteen seasons.  Nevertheless, he was chosen as the Pac-10's Coach of the Year four times.  Nationally, however, his Bruins teams were perennial top-ten contenders in NCAA competition.  Ballatore's swimmers won twenty-six NCAA championships in individual events, plus another two NCAA championships in relay events.  His UCLA swimmers also compiled a 98 percent graduation rate.

A combination of Title IX compliance problems and the weak financial condition of the UCLA athletic department in the early 1990s forced UCLA to disband the Bruins men's swimming program after the 1993–94 season.  Ballatore became the head coach of the Brown Bears swimming team at Brown University from 1994 to 1995, and the Florida Gators swimming and diving team at the University of Florida from 1996 to 1999.  Before UCLA, he coached the Lancers swim team of Pasadena City College from 1967 to 1978.

While leading the UCLA Bruins swimming program, Ballatore coached twenty-eight Olympians, including gold medalists Brian Goodell and Tom Jager.  He also served as a coach for five Olympic swimming teams, including the United States team at the 1984 Summer Olympics and 1988 Summer Olympics, the Peruvian team in 1968, the Ecuadorian team in 1972, and the Israeli team in 1976.  He also served as the head coach of the U.S. national swimming team at the 1975 Pan American Games, where his American men's swimmers won twenty-six medals in individual and relay events.

He was a graduate of Southern Illinois University, receiving a bachelor of science degree in 1962.  While he was an undergraduate, he received All-American honors competing in the backstroke for the Southern Illinois Salukis swimming team.  He later earned a master's degree in educational psychology from Azusa Pacific University in 1975.

He was inducted into the American Swimming Coaches Association Hall of Fame in 2009, and the UCLA Athletics Hall of Fame in 2012.

Ballatore and his first wife, Sandra Lee had two children, a daughter and a son. With his second wife, Ann Claire he had three children two girls and a boy. He died in Gainesville, Florida, from cancer; he was 71 years old.

See also 

 American Swimming Coaches Association
 List of Southern Illinois University alumni
 List of University of Florida Olympians
 UCLA Bruins

References

Further reading
 Ron Ballatore, William Miller and Bob O'Conner. Swimming and Aquatics Today. Eagen, Minnesota: West Group, 1990.  .

1941 births
2012 deaths
American Olympic coaches
American swimming coaches
Azusa Pacific University alumni
Brown Bears swimming coaches
Florida Gators swimming coaches
Southern Illinois Salukis men's swimmers
Swimmers from Chicago
UCLA Bruins swimming coaches